Curtis Morton Turner (April 12, 1924 – October 4, 1970) was an American stock car racer that won 17 NASCAR Grand National Division races and 38 NASCAR Convertible Division races. Throughout his life, he developed a reputation for drinking and partying. He also fought to form a drivers union, which got him banned by NASCAR founder Bill France Sr. for four years.

History
He was born in Floyd, Virginia to Morton and Minnie Turner on April 12, 1924. Curtis grew up with a brother and two sisters. His father, Morton Turner, was into the moonshine business and had a productive still. Curtis was responsible for delivering his father's moonshine to the customers. From a very early age, long before he was old enough for a driver’s license, Curtis developed his driving talents by running moonshine through the mountains from the law. He was never caught by anyone. Locals spoke of how Curtis would drive away from the hot pursuit of revenuers and lawmen and his legendary ability to turn a car 180 degrees in a very small space.

He began his racing career in 1946 when he finished 18th in a field of 18 contestants in a race at Mount Airy, North Carolina.  However, he rebounded and won his next race. He also was one of the founding members in the original group that met in Daytona Beach at the Streamline Hotel to discuss and support the formation of NASCAR. During his career, he won 360 races in several different racing series, including 22 in the NASCAR Convertible Division in 1956, and 17 wins in the NASCAR Grand National Series.  From 1950 to 1954, he drove for Oldsmobile being billed as the Blond Blizzard of Virginia.  He switched to driving Fords in 1954.  He eventually acquired the nickname of Pops, allegedly because of the way he would "pop" other drivers on the track.

Turner drove a Holman Moody-prepared Studebaker Lark in the 2-hour compact car race accompanying the inaugural United States Grand Prix at Sebring, Florida, on December 12, 1959. He finished second overall, trailing the disc-brake-equipped Jaguar 3.4 of Walt Hansgen.

Turner frequently stayed out partying until the early hours, usually with a friend and fellow driver, Joe Weatherly.

Accomplishments
He is noted for several other racing accomplishments:

 The only NASCAR driver to win two Grand National races in a row from the pole by leading every lap (Rochester, New York, and Charlotte, North Carolina in July 1950)
 The only win in NASCAR for Nash — Charlotte 150 — April 1, 1951
 The only driver to win 25 major NASCAR races in one season driving the same car in each of them (in 1956 — 22 were won as the #26 car in the convertible division, the other three, including the 1956 Southern 500, were with a top welded on.)
 The only driver to win a major NASCAR race that was red-flagged because his car was the only one still running (at the Asheville-Weaverville, North Carolina track on September 30, 1956.)
 Turner conceptualized, secured financing for, and built Charlotte Motor Speedway in 1960 before being forced out by his business partners.
 The first driver to climb Pikes Peak in less than 15 minutes (in a 1962 Ralph Moody Ford — the actual time was 14 minutes 37 seconds for the 12.42-mile course.)
 The first winner of the American 500 at the Rockingham Speedway (in a 1965 Woods Brothers Ford.)
 The first driver to qualify for a NASCAR Grand National race at a speed greater than 180 miles per hour (1967 Daytona 500, driving #13, a 1967 Smokey Yunick Chevrolet.)
Turner's 1967 Daytona 500 car designed by Smokey Yunick, seen to the right, was the inspiration for the car driven by the Talladega Nights character Reese Bobby. The car was banned by NASCAR thus starting Smokey's tenuous relationship with NASCAR.
 In 1999, he was inducted into the Virginia Sports Hall of Fame.
 In 2006, he was inducted intothe Motorsports Hall of Fame of America.
 In 2016, he was inducted into the NASCAR Hall of Fame.

Labor union
Needing money to support the newly constructed Charlotte Motor Speedway, Turner and his business partner Bruton Smith turned to the Teamsters Union to organize a union for them, the Federation of Professional Athletes, in 1961. According to The Washington Post: "His aims are for better purses, a share in broadcasting rights and retirement benefits for the drivers." NASCAR founder Bill France Sr. refused to let any driver who was a part of the union race, and eventually all the drivers except for Turner and Tim Flock sided with France. Turner and Flock were banned for life and Charlotte Motor Speedway went bankrupt before being saved by its board of directors.

Turner continued to race under other sanctioning bodies, including the Midwest Association for Race Cars (MARC), even promoting his 100-mile event on the dirt at Lakewood Speedway, Georgia, in October 1961. Tim Flock finished second in that event. Turner and Flock sued NASCAR and France, "seeking $200,000 punitive damages each and restitution for loss of earnings." "Attorneys for the drivers claim the ban represents a violation of state right to work laws because test driving contracts involving $150 a day plus expenses were canceled as a result of the action. NASCAR and France's attorneys contended the ban isn't a right-to-work violation because it doesn't involve an employer-employee relationship. They said Flock and Turner are individual contractors and not employees of NASCAR or any track."

During his NASCAR ban, Turner attempted a few USAC Championship Cars races, in 1962, Turner attempted a race at Illinois State Fairgrounds but failed to qualify. In 1963 Turner competed in the season-opener at Trenton International Speedway and finished 12th. He also attempted the 1963 Indianapolis 500 but failed to qualify.

NASCAR comeback
Turner's NASCAR ban was lifted after four years in 1965, and Turner returned to racing. Bill France was in a bind and needed to mend some fences. 1962 and 1963 NASCAR-points champion Weatherly was killed driving a Mercury at Riverside, California on January 19, 1964, and his star driver Fireball Roberts had died following a fiery crash on May 24, 1964, at the World 600 in Charlotte. The track owners wanted Turner back. "Turner was slated to drive for a newly-organized group, The Grand American Racing Association, organized July 31 in Sumter, S.C. Turner was due to compete in the first of 17 scheduled races at Concord, N.C. Aug 21." France was also short of cars. The Chrysler factory was boycotting NASCAR over the organizing body's ban of the Hemi engine, and Richard Petty went drag racing in the first half of the 1965 season. The Ford factory was also in dispute with NASCAR over the SOHC engine, which faced a joint NASCAR-USAC ban on December 17, 1965.

Turner, then 41, soon notched the first victory of his comeback in a Ford at the inaugural American 500, at the North Carolina Motor Speedway, Rockingham, North Carolina, on October 31, 1965, winning a purse of $13,090. Turner lost his Ford ride in 1966 when: "Ford withdrew its factory backed racing teams from competition when the National Association for Stock Car Auto Racing and the United States Auto Club ruled April 6 that Fords equipped with an overhead cam engine must carry 427 additional pounds." Turner started the 1966 season in a Ford, but with the Ford-factory withdrawal, he signed to drive a Chevrolet for Smokey Yunick out of Daytona Beach, Florida.

In 1968 he was the first NASCAR driver to appear on the cover of Sports Illustrated.

Death and legacy
Curtis Turner died in an airplane crash near Punxsutawney, Pennsylvania on October 4, 1970; the crash also killed golfer Clarence King. Police said the Aero Commander 500 piloted by Turner crashed shortly after taking off from the Dubois-Jefferson Airport en route to Roanoke, Virginia. At the time of the crash, Turner was preparing to compete in that week's National 500 at Charlotte in a special one-off race.

In December 2017, the Virginia Department of Historic Resources approved the erection of a historic marker denoting Turner's birthplace in Floyd County and detailing his accomplishments.

Motorsports career results

NASCAR
(key) (Bold – Pole position awarded by qualifying time. Italics – Pole position earned by points standings or practice time. * – Most laps led. ** – All laps led.)

Grand National Series

Daytona 500

See also
Buck Baker
Joe Weatherly

References

External links
Curtis Turner at Nascar.com
Curtis Turner at International Motorsports Hall of Fame
Curtis Turner at FireballRoberts.com

1924 births
1970 deaths
Accidental deaths in Pennsylvania
Aviators killed in aviation accidents or incidents in the United States
Burials in Virginia
International Motorsports Hall of Fame inductees
NASCAR drivers
People from Floyd, Virginia
Racing drivers from Virginia
Victims of aviation accidents or incidents in 1970
USAC Stock Car drivers
NASCAR controversies
NASCAR Hall of Fame inductees